The Chernomorets Stadium (Stadium "Chornomorets'") is a football stadium built in 2011 in Odesa, Ukraine. The stadium has a capacity of 34,164 and is the home of FC Chornomorets Odesa. The inaugural match, between FC Chornomorets Odesa and FC Karpaty Lviv, was played on 19 November 2011, and ended with a 2–2 draw. The first goal was scored by Vitaliy Balashov in the 46th minute from a penalty.

The stadium was constructed on the site of the old Soviet multi-use Central Stadium of the Black Sea Shipping Company (ChMP), which was demolished in 2009.

The venue was considered to be one of the stadiums of UEFA Euro 2012 but failed to be nominated as such.

There is an ongoing renovation of the stadium. The completion date is still unknown.

Former stadium
The former ChMP stadium was built on the same site in 1935, and it was originally named as Stanislav Kosior Stadium after the First Secretary of the Communist Party of the Ukrainian SSR, Stanislav Kosior. After Stanislav Kosior was repressed in the 1930s, the name was changed to Shevchenko Park Stadium. 

After World War II, the stadium was passed to the ownership of the republican Ministry of Food and received name as the Central Stadium Kharchovyk. At the end of the 1950s, it was renamed as Avanhard Stadium after the Ukrainian Sport Society of industrial workers. In 1959, the stadium was renamed to the Central Stadium of the Black Sea Shipping Company or alternatively Central Stadium Chornomorets.

ChMP could hold 34,362 people. It hosted the Ukrainian Super Cup from 2004 until 2007. At the end of 2008, it was closed and, in 2009, it was demolished.

New stadium

Financial crisis
The stadium was a part of a defunct Imexbank assets. On May 26, 2020, the Deposit Guarantee Fund of Ukraine sold at auction the Chornomorets Stadium to the American company "Allrise Capital Inc.", for UAH 193.8 million ($7.24 million). Allrise Capital's main owner is Russian expat in America Vladimir Yevseyev.

In August of 2020, the Shevchenko District Court of Kiev arrested the stadium complex and handed over to the Agency in search and management of assets (Ukrainian). The pretrial investigation began based on a statement of public organization "Olimpik" that owns the football club with the same name. About ten days later it was announced that the same court decided to cancel arrest of the stadium.

In February 2023, the facade of the Chornomorets stadium was de-Russified.

Gallery

See also
 Black Sea Shipping Company, former owner of the stadium

References

External links
Chornomorets Stadium official homepage
Webcam Chornomorets Stadium
Video presentation of the Chernomorets Odesa Stadium
Stadiony.net - Prokopenko Arena (Stadion Czornomorca)

Football venues in Ukraine
Buildings and structures in Odesa
FC Chornomorets Odesa
Sport in Odesa
Sports venues in Odesa Oblast
Avanhard (sports society)
Sports venues completed in 2011
2011 establishments in Ukraine